Pleurothallis oxapampae is a species of orchid from Peru first described by Carlyle A. Luer in 1982.

References 

oxapampae
Endemic orchids of Peru
Plants described in 1982